Catfield Fen is a wetland nature reserve near Ludham in the county of Norfolk, England. Butterfly Conservation owns and manages part of this reserve. Part of the Ant Broads & Marshes National Nature Reserve, the Butterfly Conservation part of the site comprises . The remainder is owned privately by the Catfield Hall Estate.

The nature reserve was established by the conservationist landowner Keith Arundel McDougall, son of Douglas McDougall of the McDougall of Makerstoun family.
Catfield Fen is well known amongst Broadland ecologists as one of the most important areas of fen in the United Kingdom. The wide variety of plant communities support many rare species. The site is especially important for invertebrates, with an internationally important aquatic beetle assemblage including many Red Data Book species. Other rare invertebrates include the swallowtail butterfly, the lesser water measurer, small dotted footman moth and Fenn's wainscot moth.

Catfield Fen also has important populations of many rare plants, of particular note are the fen orchid, the round leaved wintergreen, crested buckler fern and milk parsley. The latter being the food plant of the swallowtail butterfly.

Catfield Fen has appeared in local media in 2013 and 2014 due to concerns that the site may be being affected by local agricultural water abstraction. There are two abstraction licenses up for renewal in 2014 which are being considered by the Environment Agency. Site managers, local ecologist, the Broads Authority and Natural England have all raised concerns that the hydrological modelling carried out by the Environment Agency is insufficient to conclude that it will have no significant effect on the integrity of the site.

For safety reasons, the nature reserve is not open to the public, but it can be viewed from the footpath at the end of Fenside Lane, Catfield.

Anglian Water recently undertook a £9m project to help protect the reserve, building a pipeline that would end the need to take local water supply from a borehole in the area.

References

Butterfly Conservation reserves